Elections to Wigan Council were held on 6 May 1976, with one third of the seats up for election. Four Conservative gains and an Independent in Ward 23 regaining a seat reduced Labour's working majority to 40 seats. Two seats (Ward 4 and Ward 21) went uncontested, and turnout rose to 34.0% - a return to 1973 levels after a sizeable fall the previous year.

Election result

This result had the following consequences for the total number of seats on the Council after the elections:

Ward results

References

1976 English local elections
1976
May 1976 events in the United Kingdom
1970s in Greater Manchester